The 1907 Haskell Indians football team was an American football team that represented the Haskell Indian Institute (now known as Haskell Indian Nations University) as an independent during the 1907 college football season. In its first and only season under head coach Bemus Pierce, Haskell compiled a 2–6–1 record and was outscored by a total of 167 to 38.

Schedule

References

Haskell
Haskell Indian Nations Fighting Indians football seasons
Haskell Indians football